Miss World 1952, the 2nd edition of the Miss World, was held on 14 November 1952 at the Lyceum Ballroom in London, United Kingdom. 11 contestants competed for the crown. Kiki Håkansson of Sweden crowned her successor May-Louise Flodin of Sweden. It was the first back to back victories in Miss World. During this crowning moment, Flodin awarded a trophy and a bouquet. There are no official crown and sash during this time.

Results

Contestants
11 contestants competed for the crown (9 foreign & 2 British)
  - Doreen Dawne
  - Marleen Ann Dee
  - Lillian Christensen
  - Eeva Maria Hellas
  - Nicole Drouin
  - Vera Marks
  - Sanny Weitner
  - Eithne Dunne
  - May-Louise Flodin †
  - Sylvia Müller
  - Tally Richards

Notes

Debuts

Disqualified contestants
  - Anne-Marie Pauwels was disqualified after she refused to part from her boyfriend during the contest (he accompanied her to England).
 -

External links
 Miss World official website

Miss World
1952 in London
1952 beauty pageants
Beauty pageants in the United Kingdom
November 1952 events in the United Kingdom